Elections to Sheffield City Council were held on 1 May 1975. One third of the council was up for election.

Election result

This result had the following consequences for the total number of seats on the Council after the elections:

Ward results

Joseph Thomas was a sitting councillor for Gleadless ward

References

1975 English local elections
1975
1970s in Sheffield